The 2010 Knoxville Challenger was a professional tennis tournament played on outdoor hard courts. It was the seventh edition of the tournament which was part of the 2010 ATP Challenger Tour. It took place in Knoxville, Tennessee, United States between 8 and 14 November 2010.

Singles main-draw entrants

Seeds

 Rankings are as of November 1, 2010.

Other entrants
The following players received wildcards into the singles main draw:
  Boris Čonkić
  Eric Quigley
  John-Patrick Smith
  Rhyne Williams

The following players received entry from the qualifying draw:
  Yuki Bhambri
  Luka Gregorc
  David Martin
  Nicholas Monroe
  Fritz Wolmarans (LL)

Champions

Singles

 Kei Nishikori def.  Robert Kendrick, 6–1, 6–4

Doubles

 Rik de Voest /  Izak van der Merwe def.  Alex Bogomolov Jr. /  Alex Kuznetsov, 6–1, 6–4

External links
ITF Search 
ATP official site

Knoxville Challenger
Knoxville Challenger
2010 in American tennis
2010 in sports in Tennessee